The Writing Master is an 1882 painting by Thomas Eakins. It is part of the collection of the Metropolitan Museum of Art.

The subject of the painting is Eakin's father, the calligraphist Benjamin Eakins.

The work is on view in the Metropolitan Museum's Gallery 764

See also
 1882 in art

References

1882 paintings
Paintings by Thomas Eakins
Paintings in the collection of the Metropolitan Museum of Art